Agenor ('heroic, manly') is the name of a number of individuals and things.

People
Agenor (mythology), name of several Greek mythological characters
Agenor Maria Gołuchowski (1849–1921), Austrian statesman
Agenor (footballer, born 1981), Agenor Figueiredo Santos, Brazilian football defensive midfielder
Agenor (footballer, born 1989), Agenor Detofol, Brazilian football goalkeeper

Other uses
Agénor, both a masculine French given name and a surname
Agenor Technology, a consulting services company and cloud-based software provider based in Scotland
USS Agenor (ARL-3), a landing craft repair ship built for the United States Navy